Mosquito Lake may refer to:

 Mosquito Lake, Alaska, a community in the United States
 Mosquito Lake (Northwest Territories), a lake in Canada
 Mosquito Lake (Whatcom County, Washington), a lake in Washington
 Mosquito Lake (TV series), a short-lived Canadian television sitcom